Aleksandr Gogoberishvili (born 16 February 1977) is a Georgian former footballer.

Career statistics

Honors
FC Baku
 Azerbaijan Premier League: 2005–06

References

External links

1977 births
Living people
Footballers from Georgia (country)
Georgia (country) international footballers
FC Dinamo Tbilisi players
FC Guria Lanchkhuti players
FC Merani Tbilisi players
FC Lokomotivi Tbilisi players
Expatriate footballers from Georgia (country)
Expatriate footballers in Russia
Expatriate footballers in Azerbaijan
Russian Premier League players
FC Anzhi Makhachkala players
FC Baku players
Qarabağ FK players
AZAL PFK players
FC Sioni Bolnisi players
FC Zugdidi players
Turan-Tovuz IK players
Expatriate sportspeople from Georgia (country) in Azerbaijan
Association football midfielders
FC Shevardeni-1906 Tbilisi players
FC WIT Georgia players